Cajamarca is a department and region in Peru. The capital is the city of Cajamarca. It is located in the north part of the country and shares a border with Ecuador. Part of its territory includes the Amazon Rainforest, the largest in the world.

History

The oldest known irrigation canals in the Americas are located in the Nanchoc District of Cajamarca Department. The canals in the Zaña Valley have been radiocarbon dated to 3400 BCE, and possibly date to 4700 BCE. From the 6th to the 10th century the people of the Wari culture ruled earlier cultures in the highlands. They established the administrative center of Wiraquchapampa.

In the 15th century, the Incas conquered the territory, expanding their empire. They established their regional capital in what is now Cajamarca. The Incas in 1465 established a new province there to serve as a bridge to their later conquests.

Cajamarca had long been one of the oldest cities in South America when the Spanish arrived in their conquest of Peru.

Political division
The Region is divided into 13 provinces.

Province (Capital)

 Cajabamba (Cajabamba)
 Cajamarca (Cajamarca)
 Celendín (Celendín)
 Chota (Chota)
 Contumazá (Contumazá)
 Cutervo (Cutervo)
 Hualgayoc (Bambamarca)
 Jaén (Jaén)
 San Ignacio (San Ignacio)
 San Marcos (San Marcos)
 San Miguel (San Miguel de Pallaques)
 San Pablo (San Pablo)
 Santa Cruz (Santa Cruz de Succhubamba)

Places of interest 
 Chancaybaños Reserved Zone

Notable people
Maxima Acuña, winner of the 2016 Goldman Environmental Prize
Yma Sumac, notable exotica singer of the 1950s
Pedro Castillo, President of Peru (2021–2022)

References

 
Cajamarca
Departments of Peru